George Courtauld (1761–1823) was the founder of Courtaulds which was to become the UK's largest manufacturer of mourning crape.

Career
Apprenticed to a Spitalfields silk weaver in 1775, George Courtauld first worked on his own as silk throwster. Between 1785 and 1794 he made a number of visits to America. In 1794 he established his own textile business at Pebmarsh under the name George Courtald & Co. However by 1816 the business was in financial difficulty: that year George's son Samuel took over the business and built it into the UK's largest manufacturer of mourning crape.

George was an ardent Unitarian.

He retired to America where he died in 1823.

Family

George was born on 19 September 1761 to Samuel Courtauld and Louisa Ogier.

George Courtauld married Ruth Minton on 10 July 1789. Their children were: 
Samuel Courtauld (1793–1881)
Catherine Courtauld (1795-)
George Courtauld (1802–1861)

References

1761 births
1823 deaths
English businesspeople
British textile industry businesspeople
George
English emigrants to the United States
English people of French descent